Grub Street Productions was an American production company founded in 1989 by three writers and producers: David Angell, Peter Casey and David Lee - who met while working on Cheers and left that show to form it. It was affiliated with Paramount Television (now CBS Television Studios).

The company is most notable for creating the popular television sitcom Frasier, which aired on NBC for eleven seasons from 1993 to 2004, totalling 264 episodes and the recipient and winner of many Emmy awards, and the long-running series Wings, which likewise aired on NBC, running for eight seasons and 172 episodes from 1990 to 1997. Additionally, the more short-lived sitcoms The Pursuit of Happiness and Encore! Encore!, were produced by the company.

Formation 
David Angell, Peter Casey, and David Lee met on Cheers and left that series during its seventh season, in March 1989, to form the upcoming production company, which became Grub Street Productions. While they were writing for Cheers, they knew they would want to continue working together once it ended. Casey won an Emmy in 1989, which helped when it came time to form his own production company with his writing partners. It was named after a famous street in London, Grub Street, which became a metaphor for the commercial production of printed matter, and a world or class of impoverished journalists and writers or literary hacks.

Production 

The Advocate called the production company "hugely successful" and the LA Times described them as a "sitcom factory". Warren Littlefield, president of NBC Entertainment, was quoted as saying: “If they come to us with a show, we want it. When you have people with their track record, you have to believe in them and let them take chances.” At one point, NBC had three Grub Street shows on the air at the same time.

Wings 
Wings became their first produced show, first hitting the air in 1990. It would run for eight seasons up to 1997 and was considered a success, though never quite as high-profile as Cheers or Frasier.

Frasier 
Kelsey Grammer guest-starred on an episode of Wings in 1992 (for which he was nominated for an Emmy) and he enjoyed his week working on the show with the trio so much that he asked them to create a new show for him as he knew Cheers was coming to an end (its final season would air in 1993). They obliged, first pitching a completely unrelated show for the star with plans for Grammer to play a paraplegic millionaire resembling Malcolm Forbes, "a magazine mogul [and] a motorcycle enthusiast". The idea was deemed unsuitable and scrapped. At the time they weren't interested in doing a Frasier Crane spin-off as they didn't want to become known as the "spin-off guys". However, the pitch was not what NBC and Paramount were looking for - and instead they firmly suggested Grub Street focus on continuing the storyline of the Frasier character, thus Frasier become the second major show produced by the company and arguably its most successful, winning many awards and garnering much critical praise. They decided to move Frasier Crane out of Boston to avoid any resemblance to Cheers. The spinoff idea would have focused primarily on "his work at a radio station", but they found that idea was too similar to an older sitcom, WKRP in Cincinnati. Therefore, they decided to add in his private life, such as his father Martin and brother Niles. In his titular spin-off, Frasier becomes "haughty, disdainful, and exceedingly uptight."

Other shows 
Other series produced by Grub Street include The Pursuit of Happiness in 1995 and Encore! Encore! in the 1998–1999 season. Both of those short-lived series also aired on NBC.

Dissolution and possible revival
After Encore! Encore!, which David Lee said "proved to be a disaster", he began to rethink his career, deciding to work in the theatre, and started to dissolve Grub Street Productions. "My partners and I still work together and it’s very amiable, but the partnership only exists as long as Frasier exists," he said.

The company has not been active since the series finale of Frasier in 2004, but a revival of said show is forthcoming from Paramount+, which may reactivate it.

References

External links 
 Grub Street Productions on IMDB

Television production companies of the United States
American companies established in 1989
American companies disestablished in 2004
CBS Studios
Paramount Television